Corpus Christi School may refer to:

Corpus Christi School (Hobart) in Tasmania, Australia
Corpus Christi School (Ottawa), Ontario, Canada
Pallikoodam, an experimental school in India formerly known as Corpus Christi School
Corpus Christi School in New York City - see Corpus Christi Church (New York City)#Buildings
Corpus Christi School (Cagayan de Oro City), in Mindanao, Philippines, one of cagayan de Oro's high schools
Corpus Christi school (Glasgow) in Knightswood, Glasgow.